Alex Nahigian (April 3, 1919 – July 30, 2001) was an American college baseball and football player and coach.  He was the head baseball coach at Providence (1960–1978) and Harvard (1979–1990), making a total of nine NCAA Tournament appearances between the two schools.  He also served as an assistant football coach at Brown and Harvard.

Early life
Nahigian was born on April 3, 1919.  Nahigian came from an Armenian background but was born in Cambridge, Massachusetts.  He attended both Medford High School in Medford, Massachusetts and St. John's Prep in Danvers, Massachusetts.

Playing career
Nahigian played football and baseball at the College of the Holy Cross in Worcester, Massachusetts.  An injury prevented him from playing football past his sophomore season, but he played baseball for College Baseball Hall of Fame coach Jack Barry all four years, captaining the team his senior year.

After graduating in 1942, Nahigian worked as a teacher and a high school baseball and football coach in Rhode Island.  He also played three season of minor league baseball from 1946–1948, appearing in the Class B New England League with the Pawtucket Slaters, Portland Pilots, and Providence Grays.

Coaching career

Football
After his baseball playing career was over, Nahigian started his collegiate coaching career as a football coach. He was an assistant at Brown from 1949–1972. He also served two stints as an assistant at Harvard, 1973–1975 and 1978–1981.

Baseball

Providence
Nahigian was a successful high school baseball coach in Rhode Island in the 1940s and 1950s, and he was chosen to succeed Robert Murray as Providence's head coach for the start of the 1960 season.  Providence then competed as an independent in the NCAA's District 1, which encompassed New England.

In his fourth season, 1963, he led Providence to the program's first NCAA Tournament.  At the District 1 Regional, the Friars defeated Connecticut in the opening three-game series but fell to Holy Cross in the regional final.

In his 19-year tenure at Providence, Nahigian led the Friars to five more NCAA Tournaments and had an overall record of 221-173-2.  His best season at Providence was 1973, when the team went 23-6-1 and appeared in its 5th NCAA Tournament.  At the District 1 Regional, the team dropped its opening game to Northeastern.  It recovered in the losers bracket to beat Massachusetts and Northeastern to reach the regional final. There, it lost to Harvard, 8-1.  Nahigian was named the 1973 New England Coach of the Year.

Harvard
Nahigian replaced Loyal Park as Harvard's head baseball coach for the start of the 1979 season.  Nahigian was a Cambridge native, attended high school near Boston, and had served as an assistant football coach at Harvard from 1973–1975.  He was the unanimous selection of Harvard's search committee, largely due to his success at Providence.  Nahigian spent 12 seasons at Harvard, leading the Crimson to three NCAA Tournaments.

The Crimson's three NCAA Tournament appearances came at the Northeast Regional in 1980, 1983, and 1984 after it won the EIBL title in each of those seasons.  The program reached regional finals in 1980 (6-3 loss to St. John's) and 1983 (4-3 loss to Maine).  In 1985, Harvard shared the EIBL title with Princeton but was defeated in a playoff and did not reach the NCAA Tournament. In 1990, Nahigian's final season, Harvard participated in the first Baseball Beanpot, finishing as the runner-up to Boston College.

Nahigian was named the New England Coach of the Year in 1983, 1984, and 1985.  In 1989, he received the Jack Butterfield Award.

Head coaching record
Below is a table of Nahigian's yearly records as a collegiate head baseball coach.

References

1919 births
2001 deaths
Brown Bears football coaches
Harvard Crimson baseball coaches
Harvard Crimson football coaches
Holy Cross Crusaders baseball players
Holy Cross Crusaders football players
High school baseball coaches in the United States
High school football coaches in Rhode Island
Pawtucket Slaters players
Providence Friars baseball coaches
Providence Grays (minor league) players
Sportspeople from Cambridge, Massachusetts
American people of Armenian descent